Leonardo's Diary (Czech: Leonardův deník) is a 1972 stop-motion animated short.  It features images of Leonardo da Vinci's paintings interspersed with footage of real life. As of March 2016, the 12-minute film does not currently have a rating on Rotten Tomatoes, but IMDb rates the film at 6.4, while on Filmgator the film holds a 7.0 rating.

External links

References

1972 films
1970s Czech-language films
Czech animated films
Films directed by Jan Švankmajer
Surrealist films
Czechoslovak animated short films
Film controversies in the Czech Republic
1970s Czech films